Danilo Petrović and Tak Khunn Wang were the defending champions but chose not to defend their title.

Gero Kretschmer and Alexander Satschko won the title after defeating Andreas Mies and Oscar Otte 2–6, 7–6(8–6), [10–3] in the final.

Seeds

Draw

References
 Main Draw

ZS-Sports China International Challenger - Doubles
2017 in Chinese tennis